Adam Kensy (born 18 November 1956) is a Polish football manager and a former player who played as a midfielder. He is the manager of Austrian club SC Marchtrenk. He appeared in three matches for the Poland national team in 1983.

References

External links
 

1956 births
Living people
Polish footballers
Poland international footballers
Association football midfielders
Pogoń Szczecin players
Zawisza Bydgoszcz players
LASK players
Ekstraklasa players
Austrian Football Bundesliga players
People from Piła County
Polish football managers
LASK managers
FC Blau-Weiß Linz managers
SK Vorwärts Steyr managers
Polish expatriate football managers
Expatriate football managers in Austria
Polish expatriate sportspeople in Austria